Sri Vijaya Visakha Milk Producers Company Ltd (Visakha Dairy) is a company located in the Indian state of Andhra Pradesh. It sells Milk & Milk Products in the name of Visakha Dairy. It works on cooperative principles. Almost every North Coastal district in the state has milk producing co-operatives. The milk is collected from member farmers, processed and sold in the market under the brand of Visakha Dairy.

History
In 1973, Vijaya Visakha Milk Producers Company Ltd was established. In 1977, this plant reached 50,000 LPD handling capacity. In 1999, it registered as "Sri Vijaya Visakha District Milk Producers Mutually Aided Cooperative Union Ltd."

In 2006, the name of the company converted to Sri Vijaya Visakha Milk Producers Company Limited.

Turnover

References 

Economy of Visakhapatnam
Economy of Andhra Pradesh
Dairy products companies of India
Cooperatives in India
Dairy cooperatives in India
1973 establishments in Andhra Pradesh
Indian companies established in 1973